The Los Laureles Lodge is a historic American lodge in Carmel Valley, California. The Pacific Improvement Company used the lodge as a game preserve for Hotel Del Monte guests to hunt, fish, and canoe the Carmel River. Today, the Los Laureles Lodge is a resort hotel and restaurant.

History

The Los Laureles Lodge got its beginnings as part of Rancho Los Laureles, the  Mexican land grant in present-day Monterey County, California given in 1839 by Governor Juan Alvarado to José Manuel Boronda and Vicente Blas Martínez.

Rancho Los Laureles passed through several owners before being sold to Nathan Weston Spaulding (1829–1903) in 1874. He was the 15th Mayor of Oakland (1871-1873). 

Spaulding owned the Los Rancho Laureles from 1874 to 1881. He placed the rancho under the management of his brother-in-law, Kinzea Stone Clinkenbeard (1842–1895), who began innovations. Clinkenbeard and his family lived for a short time in the three-room Boronda Adobe until they built a more modern ranch house, which became known as the Los Laureles Lodge. Irrigation to water the fields and fencing were introduced for the first time in Carmel Valley. He built the barns and established new cattle breeds.

Pacific Improvement Company

In 1882, Spaulding sold Rancho Los Laureles to the Pacific Improvement Company (PIC). The Hotel Del Monte in Monterey, built in 1879, wanted the water rights from the Carmel River that ran through Rancho Los Laureles as well as a game preserve for their hotel guests. In 1888, PIC hired William Hatton to manage their purchase and develop the Del Monte dairies and ranching operation in Los Laureles. In the 1890s, the Los Laureles ranch house became the "headquarters" for management of the lands the PIC had purchased.

In 1896, PIC added several guests cottages and enlarged the Los Laureles Lodge, to accommodate the Del Monte Hotel guests who would endure a four-hour "tally-ho" coach ride from Monterey to what they called the "Rancho Del Monte" in Carmel Valley. Visitors to the Rancho enjoyed hunting game, fishing on the Carmel River, and taking hikes on the many trails. Hatton modernized the diary operations, adding Durham cattle to the Holsteins that increased the milk butterfat content. Large vats and presses were installed to manufacture Monterey Jack cheese. The Hatton's lived in the ranch house built by Kinzea Clinkenbeard and raised their seven children there. The Del Monte milk barn dates to 1890 when Hatton used the ventilation tower on the roof to cool the milk. The Boronda adobe was the center for the PIC's dairy operation.

Del Monte Properties

In the 1900s the PIC liquidated their  holdings and the Del Monte Properties headed by Samuel FB Morse, acquired the land in 1919. In 1923, the Del Monte Properties divided the land into 11 parcels. Golf champion Marion Hollins bought , which later became the Camrel Valley Village and the Holman Ranch. Samuel "Sam" Fertig from Pennsylvania, purchased Los Laureles that included the Boronda adobe and the Laureles Lodge.

In the early 1930s, Muriel Vanderbilt Phelps bought the ranch from Sam Fertig, where she converted the former Carriage House into a Ranch House and built stables and kept thoroughbred racehorses. She entertained guests at the ranch and built a swimming pool at the front of her ranch house. In May 1946, Vanderbilt sold  of the property to Frank B. Porter and his son Paul for an estimated $200,000, which included the Boronda Adobe. The property was converted into the Rancho Del Monte subdivision and Rancho Del Monte Country Club, which is now the Los Laureles Lodge.

Legacy
Today, the Laureles Lodge is owned by Sanborn Griffin and is a resort hotel and restaurant. The Del Monte milk barn dates to 1890, and still stands today in Carmel Valley Village just before the Robles del Rio Road. In 1940, it was converted to the White Oak Inn, later an art gallery, and a real estate office.

See also
List of hotels in the United States

References

External links

 Official website

1890 establishments in California
Carmel Valley, California
Hotels in California
Preferred Hotels & Resorts
Buildings and structures in Monterey County, California